Malcolm Kemp Savidge (born 9 May 1946 in Surrey, England) is a politician in the United Kingdom.  He was Labour Party Member of Parliament (MP) for Aberdeen North, in Scotland, from the 1997 general election until he stood down at the 2005 general election.

Early life
Educated at Wallington County Grammar School and then Aberdeen University, he was previously a maths teacher for 24 years and was a member of Aberdeen City Council. In 1991, he unsuccessfully contested the Kincardine and Deeside by-election, where he finished in fourth place, and he was defeated again fighting the same seat at the general election the following year.

Parliamentary career
He was elected for Aberdeen North in 1997, with a 47.9% share of the vote and a majority of 10,010 votes over Brian Adam of the SNP.

The Sunday Working (Scotland) Act 2003 was the result of a Private Member's Bill raised by Savidge during 2003. The Act extended to Scotland the rights enjoyed by shopworkers in England and Wales to refuse to work on a Sunday.

When the number of Parliamentary constituencies in Scotland was reduced for the 2005 general election, the former Aberdeen Central constituency was mostly absorbed into an expanded Aberdeen North. The Aberdeen Central MP Frank Doran was selected as the Labour candidate for Aberdeen North, and Savidge did not contest the 2005 general election.

After Parliament
Since leaving Westminster he has been a member of the British American Security Information Council , and has been a consultant to the Oxford Research Group.

External links 
 
 TheyWorkForYou.com – Malcolm Savidge
 bio at Oxford Research Group

1946 births
Living people
Councillors in Aberdeen
Scottish Labour councillors
People from Surrey
Scottish Labour MPs
Members of the Parliament of the United Kingdom for Aberdeen constituencies
Scottish schoolteachers
UK MPs 1997–2001
UK MPs 2001–2005
Alumni of the University of Aberdeen
People educated at Wallington County Grammar School